Dianol is a synthetic, nonsteroidal estrogen that was never marketed. It is a dimer and impurity of anol, and was, along with hexestrol, involved in erroneous findings of highly potent estrogenic activity with anol. Although a potent estrogen, it requires a dose of 100 μg to show activity, whereas hexestrol shows activity with a mere dose of 0.2 μg.

See also
 Anethole
 Dianethole
 Diethylstilbestrol
 Stilbestrol

References

Phenols
Synthetic estrogens